Picão Flor is a settlement in Cantagalo District, São Tomé Island in the nation of São Tomé and Príncipe. Its population is 1,911 (2012 census). It lies 1.2 km southwest of Santana.

Population history

References

Populated places in Cantagalo District